Moustiers-Sainte-Marie, or simply Moustiers, is a commune in the Alpes-de-Haute-Provence department in the Provence-Alpes-Côte d'Azur region of Southeastern France. In 2017, it had a population of 709. It considered one of the "most beautiful villages of France".

Geography
It lies at the western entrance to the Verdon Gorge (Gorges du Verdon). The village has been a centre of the pottery trade, especially faïence, for centuries. A spring flows out of the cliff and creates a waterfall in town, providing water power.

The village was built on platform terraces a hundred or so metres up the side of a limestone cliff.  At twilight, when the sun on a clear day strikes the south-facing cliff, a diffuse pink light glows across the village.

The Star
Above the town, a gold-painted star hangs on a 225m-long chain suspended between two cliffs. Its origin, according to a legend popularised by Provençal poet Frédéric Mistral, lies in the 10th century; the original star and chain have been replaced several times since then. The current star is about 50 years old. Ten years ago it fell after the chain snapped, and was rehung using a helicopter.

Legend
According to the legend, during the Crusades the knight Bozon de Blacas was held prisoner by the Saracens; he vowed to hang a star over his village if he was able to return. No one knows how the star was originally hung there.

Population

International relations

Moustiers-Sainte-Marie is twinned with Montelupo Fiorentino in Italy.

See also
Communes of the Alpes-de-Haute-Provence department
List of works by Louis Botinelly

References

External links

 Moustiers Official Tourism website
 Moustiers Village website

Communes of Alpes-de-Haute-Provence
Plus Beaux Villages de France
Alpes-de-Haute-Provence communes articles needing translation from French Wikipedia